Angelo Cavalluzzo (born March 1, 1993) is a Canadian former professional soccer player who played as a goalkeeper. He currently serves as the head coach for Toronto Varsity Blues women's soccer and head coach for Alliance United's women's team in League1 Ontario.

Playing career 
Cavalluzzo began his career in 2012 with TFC Academy in the Canadian Soccer League, and in 2014 was transferred to Niagara United. He returned to TFC Academy in 2015 to play in the USL Premier Development League. Cavalluzzo would receive degrees in bio and chemical engineering while playing for McMaster University during this time.

In 2016, Cavalluzo was signed by Toronto FC II of the United Soccer League, where he appeared in 5 matches on an emergency basis. He made his debut on June 6, 2016 against Harrisburg City Islanders. On February 10, 2017 he extended his contract for the 2017 season. Cavalluzzo would be nominated for USL player of the month for March/April 2017, after making 18 saves and earning 3 clean sheets during that time. Upon completion of the 2017 season, Cavalluzzo would re-sign with the club for the 2018 season. Cavalluzzo would be a valuable player to Toronto FC II early in the 2018 season, but would ultimately see his season cut short in May after rupturing his achilles tendon.

Coaching career 

He served as an assistant coach for the McMaster Marauders university men's and women's soccer teams from 2016-2018. In 2018, he became an analyst for the TFC Academy as well as serving as the University of Toronto Varsity Blues soccer assistant coach. In April 2019, he was named as the Varsity Blues women's soccer head coach. In 2019, he was appointed the head coach for Hamilton United's reserve team in League1 Ontario and served as an assistant and goalkeeper coach with the Toronto FC Academy. In 2020, he was named the head coach for Hamilton United's women's team in League1 Ontario.

Career statistics

Club

References 

1993 births
Living people
Canadian soccer coaches
Canadian soccer players
Canadian Soccer League (1998–present) players
USL League Two players
USL Championship players
Soccer players from Hamilton, Ontario
Toronto FC players
Toronto FC II players
Association football goalkeepers
Toronto FC non-playing staff